Vittorio Marzotto (13 June 1922, Valdagno – 4 February 1999) was an Italian racing driver. He drove 16 sports car races between 1948 and 1955, mainly in Ferrari's, his best results being two victories and three second places. He also entered a Formula 1-race in 1952, the French Grand Prix, as reserve driver for Scuderia Ferrari. However, all Ferrari works drivers started the race, so Marzotto was unable to and he never entered Formula 1 again.
Marzotto was the son of Count Gaetano Marzotto and he was the oldest of four brothers (Paolo, Giannino, Umberto and Vittorio), who were all racing drivers too.

Complete results

References

1922 births
1999 deaths
Sportspeople from the Province of Vicenza
Italian racing drivers
Mille Miglia drivers